Jon Clifton Hinson (March 16, 1942 – July 21, 1995) was an American  politician who served as a Republican U.S. representative for Mississippi's 4th congressional district from 1979 to 1981. Following his 1981 resignation following arrest for engaging in a homosexual act, he became an LGBT activist in metropolitan Washington D.C.

Early life
Born in Tylertown in Walthall County in southwestern Mississippi, Hinson attended public schools. In 1959, he worked as a page for Democratic U. S. representative John Bell Williams, who subsequently became governor of Mississippi in 1968.

Hinson graduated from the University of Mississippi at Oxford in 1964, and joined the United States Marine Corps Reserve, in which he served until 1970.

Career
Hinson worked on the U.S. House staff as a doorman in 1967, and then served on the staffs of representatives Charles H. Griffin, a Democrat, and Thad Cochran, a Republican. In 1978, Cochran ran successfully for the United States Senate, and Hinson was elected to succeed Cochran in the House. With 51.6 percent of the vote, Hinson defeated the Democrat John H. Stennis, the son of U.S. senator John C. Stennis, who finished with 26.4 percent of the vote. The remaining ballots were cast for independent candidates.

Sexual orientation
Prior to his 1978 candidacy for the U.S. House, Hinson survived a fire on October 24, 1977, at the Washington, D.C., Gay Cinema Follies. Firefighters found him under a pile of bodies; he was one of only four men rescued.

In 1980, Hinson admitted that in 1976, while an aide to Cochran, he had been arrested for committing an obscene act after he exposed himself to an undercover policeman at the Iwo Jima Memorial in Arlington National Cemetery. Hinson then denied that he was homosexual and blamed his problems on alcoholism. He also said that he had reformed and refused to yield to demands that he resign. He won re-election on November 4, 1980, with a plurality of 39.0 percent of the vote. The Independent Leslie B. McLemore polled 29.8 percent, and Democrat Britt Singletary received 29.4 percent.

Hinson, who was married, was arrested again on February 4, 1981, and charged with attempted sodomy for performing oral sex on a male employee of the Library of Congress in a restroom of the House of Representatives. After the investigation, he was charged with sodomy.

At the time, homosexual acts, even between consenting adults, were a criminal offense. The charge was a felony that could have resulted in up to ten years in prison and fines of up to $10,000. Since both parties were consenting adults (and social attitudes were changing), the United States attorney's office reduced the charge to a misdemeanor. Facing a maximum penalty of one year in prison and a $1,000 fine, Hinson pleaded not guilty to a charge of attempted sodomy the following day and was released without bail pending a trial scheduled for May 4, 1981. Soon thereafter, he checked himself into a District of Columbia–area hospital for professional care.  Hinson later received a 30-day jail sentence, which was suspended, and a year's probation, on condition that he continue counseling and treatment.

Resignation and later life
Hinson resigned on April 13, 1981, just three months into his second term in the House. He said that his resignation had been "the most painful and difficult decision of my life." He was succeeded by Democrat Wayne Dowdy, who won the special election held in the summer of 1981.

After publicly acknowledging that he was gay, he became a gay rights activist, organizing lobbying groups and fighting against the ban on gays in the military. He lived the rest of his life in Alexandria, Virginia, and later Silver Spring, Maryland.

Death
Hinson died of respiratory failure resulting from AIDS in Silver Spring, Maryland, at the age of fifty-three.

Hinson's body was cremated. The ashes were buried in his native Tylertown, Mississippi, after a private service. By then divorced from his wife Cynthia, Hinson was survived by a brother, Robert Hinson of Gulfport, Mississippi.

See also
 List of American federal politicians convicted of crimes
 List of federal political sex scandals in the United States
 List of LGBT members of the United States Congress

References

Additional sources
 "Hinson, Facing a Morals Charge, Shuns Clamor to Quit Congress," The New York Times, 9 March 1981, A18; 
 Associated Press, "Jon Hinson Dies at 53," July 25, 1995; 
 Art Harris, "Hinson's Memory Haunts His Mississippi District," Washington Post, 17 June 1981.

External links

 

1942 births
1995 deaths
20th-century American politicians
20th-century American LGBT people
AIDS-related deaths in Maryland
American LGBT military personnel
Gay military personnel
Gay politicians
LGBT conservatism in the United States
LGBT members of the United States Congress
LGBT people from Maryland
LGBT people from Mississippi
LGBT people from Virginia
Military personnel from Mississippi
Mississippi politicians convicted of crimes
People from Alexandria, Virginia
People from Silver Spring, Maryland
People from Tylertown, Mississippi
Republican Party members of the United States House of Representatives from Mississippi
United States Marine Corps reservists
University of Mississippi alumni